Daniel Mananta (born in Jakarta, Indonesia on August 14, 1981) is an Indonesian actor, presenter and television host of mixed Chinese and Javanese descent --sometimes known as VJ Daniel Mananta. He is an Indonesian entertainer whose name emerged after winning the 2003 MTV Indonesia VJ Hunt. He has now established himself as an entertainer as well as a young entrepreneur.

Early life
Daniel led an amiable childhood in Jakarta, Indonesia. He attended Tarakanita IV in Pluit, North Jakarta, from kindergarten to the end of junior high school. Daniel moved to Perth, Australia to complete his high school education at Aquinas College. His childhood is rarely a topic of discussion, as he felt he was socially awkward until after high school. Daniel has 1 brother, William Mananta.

Life in Perth, Australia
During his school years in Perth, Daniel took up part-time employment at a (restaurant) chain called Nando’s, first as a waiter and eventually attaining a higher position equivalent to assistant manager. However, as high school final exams approached, he left the part-time job to focus on his education.

Following graduation from Aquinas College, Daniel pursued a double degree: Bachelor of Business Administration majoring in Finance, and International Business at Edith Cowan University. He graduated in 2002 at the age of 20.

While looking for an opportunity in Perth as a fresh graduate for 6 months, Daniel was involved in Network 21, a multi-level marketing system selling Amway products. As he was doing business presentations on almost a daily basis, Daniel began to enjoy public speaking. He also interned at Citibank Australia for 3 weeks.

Career

Early career

Missing his homeland, Daniel returned to Jakarta at the end of 2002. He worked with his father, who owns a store in Mangga Dua, Jakarta. Mangga Dua itself is a gargantuan shopping hub in the capital city. Unfortunately, the work was not something Daniel enjoyed, and thus he left in early 2003.

At around the same time, MTV Indonesia launched the MTV VJ Hunt 2003 event. Daniel tried his luck and entered the contest, proceeded to become a finalist from 6000 contestants and ultimately emerged as the winner of the VJ Hunt.

Soon, Daniel became a familiar face. In 2004, he hosted the Red Carpet MTV Asia Awards. During his time as an MTV VJ, he has interviewed some of the biggest names in international music – Korn, Linkin Park, Avril Lavigne, The Black Eyed Peas, Gareth Gates, Michelle Branch and Nicole Scherzinger, to name but a few.

Daniel also became ambassador for several products, including Sony Ericsson and Adidas Indonesia.

Acting and singing
In 2007, Daniel landed the lead role in I Love you Boss, an FTV produced by MNC pictures. He also starred in a soap opera produced by Sinemart, titled Antara Cinta dan Dusta (Between Love and Lies).

Daniel scored an opportunity to grace the big screen as Jimmie in the thriller Rumah Dara (Macabre) in 2009 alongside Shareefa Danish, Julie Estelle, Arifin Putra, Sigi Wimala and others. Macabre, which was directed by The Mo Brothers, was also released in international film markets.

In 2011, Daniel recorded a song with the band Potenzio, titled Twitter Dunia (World Twitter). In the song, Daniel raps. He admits to being a little less confident about singing but enjoys rapping, as it is similar to presenting but with faster articulation of words.

Presenter
Daniel hosted the third season of Indonesian Idol in 2006. The first time he hosted the popular competition, he appeared alongside Ata. His work as an MTV VJ continued as per usual.

Daniel and Ata returned as the hosts of Indonesian Idol the following year. In 2008, Daniel was paired with Dewi Sandra, an Indonesian singer, to host the fifth season of Indonesian Idol. In the sixth and seventh seasons of Indonesian Idol (2010 and 2012 respectively), Daniel was entrusted to lead the show independently.

The seasoned presenter also hosted Asian Idol in 2007, which was screened in six countries; India, Indonesia, Malaysia, the Philippines, Singapore and Vietnam. He also hosted the show Anugerah Planet Muzik 2011, shown in Indonesia, Malaysia and Singapore. in 2016, he hosted the second season of The Voice Indonesia.

DaMN

DaMN! I Love Indonesia

In 2008, Daniel launched his own clothing line on 28 October – a day commemorated as Youth Pledge Day in Indonesia. The brand, “DAMN! I Love Indonesia”, aims to remind people of Indonesia’s culture. “DAMN” is derived from his name – DAniel MaNanta.

Having resided in Australia for 7 years, Daniel felt a yearning for his home country. He was also surprised to come across other Indonesians living abroad who did not appear to be proud of Indonesia as he was, and thus, he was moved to create “DAMN! I Love Indonesia”. Comprising T-shirts, polo shirts, button up shirts, shorts, hats, and belts, the collection reflects a love of Indonesian culture.

Each “DAMN! I Love Indonesia” article carries a tag telling the story of the product in English and Bahasa Indonesia. For example, the tag on a T-shirt depicting a wayang (shadow puppet) character will bear a description about that particular character.

DAMN! I Love Indonesia first set up shop in fX shopping center in South Jakarta. In 2012, this outlet had to close down as the floor became the campus of a private educational institution.

Since 2010, DAMN! I Love Indonesia outlets can be found in Grand Indonesia Shopping Town in Jakarta and Grand City in Surabaya. In 2012, another outlet opened in Pondok Indah Mall in South Jakarta with the fifth opening in June of that year in Mal Panakukkang in Makassar.

DAMN! I Love Indonesia products can also be found online at http://www.damniloveindonesia.com.

DaMN Inc.

Daniel and a handful of partners launched DAMN.inc, an entertainment venture showcasing models as well as film and music production. DAMN.inc can be accessed on www.damninc.com

Personal life

Romance
According to Daniel, he started dating later than most – he had his first relationship when he was 17 years old. He was in a brief relationship with Marissa Nasution in 2008; a union that ended in the same year. There previously circulated rumours of Daniel with singers Agnes Monica and Sandra Dewi, but these remain unconfirmed.

He married with Viola Maria from Germany in 2011.

Hobbies
Reading comics and watching films are two of Daniel’s favorite pastimes.
Due to his demanding schedule, Daniel gets his film fix by watching on DVDs when he is at home or on the road. His batik-print Toyota Alphard even serves as a mobile home theatre.

Filmography

Film

TV series

Producer

TV commercials

Reality show

Awards
In 2007, Daniel was nominated as Best Presenter in Music at the Panasonic Awards – one of three times he would be nominated at the same awards show.
In 2008, he nabbed an award as Favorite Host at the Nickelodeon Kids’ Choice Awards.
Daniel also won the Panasonic Gobel Awards 2013 for Favorite Talent Show Presenter category.

Other Achievements

References

External links

1981 births
Indonesian Roman Catholics
Javanese people
Indonesian people of Chinese descent
Indonesian Idol
Indonesian television personalities
Indonesian television presenters
People from Jakarta
Living people
Indonesian male models
Indonesian Christians